During the 1972–73 season Hibernian, a football club based in Edinburgh, came third out of 18 clubs in the Scottish First Division, reached the fourth round of the Scottish Cup, the quarter-final of the European Cup Winners' Cup and won their first Scottish League Cup and the Drybrough Cup.

Scottish First Division

Final League table

Drybrough Cup

Scottish League Cup

Group stage

Group 2 final table

Knockout stage

European Cup Winners' Cup

Scottish Cup

See also
List of Hibernian F.C. seasons

References

External links
Hibernian 1972/1973 results and fixtures, Soccerbase

Hibernian F.C. seasons
Hibernian